Multiple C2 domains, transmembrane 2 is a protein that in humans is encoded by the MCTP2 gene.

References

Further reading